(Bold italics in name indicates popular nickname)

Affiliations

Sources
 
 African States and Rulers, John Stewart, McFarland
 Heads of State and Government, 2nd Edition, John V da Graca, MacMillan Press 2000''

See also
Angola
Democratic People's Republic of Angola
Heads of state of Angola
Heads of government of Angola
Colonial heads of Angola
Heads of government of the Democratic People's Republic of Angola
Lists of office-holders

Government of Angola
Political history of Angola